Billy's War Brides is a 1916 American silent short comedy directed and starring William Garwood. The film also stars Sonia Marcelle and Molly Gilmore.

External links

1916 comedy films
1916 films
Silent American comedy films
American silent short films
American black-and-white films
1916 short films
American comedy short films
1910s American films